Thomas Clutterbuck, D.D. (died 1700) was  an English priest in the  17th century.

Clutterbuck was  born in Dinton, Buckinghamshire and educated at Magdalen College, Oxford, becoming Fellow in 1644.  He held livings at Leckford, Llandrillo and Southampton. Clutterbuck was Archdeacon of Winchester from 1684 to 1700.

Notes

Archdeacons of Winchester (ancient)
Fellows of Magdalen College, Oxford
People from Buckinghamshire
1700 deaths